Machaerus (Μαχαιροῦς, from  [a sword];) was a Hasmonean hilltop palace and desert fortress, now in ruins, located in the village of Mukawir in modern-day Jordan,  southeast of the mouth of the Jordan river on the eastern side of the Dead Sea. According to the Jewish-Roman historian Josephus, it was the location of the imprisonment and execution of John the Baptist. According to the chronology of the Bible, the execution took place in about 32 CE shortly before the Passover, following an imprisonment of two years. The site also provides the setting for four additional New Testament figures: Herod the Great; his son, Tetrarch Herod Antipas; his second wife, Princess Herodias; and her daughter, Princess Salome.

History
The fortress Machaerus was originally built by the Hasmonean king, Alexander Jannaeus (104 BC-78 BC) in about the year 90 BC, serving an important strategic position. Its high, rocky vantage point was difficult to access, and invasions from the east could be easily spotted from there. It was also in line of sight of other Hasmonean (and later Herodian) citadels, so other fortresses could be signaled if trouble appeared on the horizon.  Nevertheless, it was destroyed by Pompey's general Gabinius in 57 BC, but later rebuilt by Herod the Great in 30 BC to be used as a military base to safeguard his territories east of the Jordan.

Upon the death of Herod the Great, the fortress was passed to his son, Herod Antipas, who ruled from 4 BC until 39 AD.  It was during this time, at the beginning of the first century AD, that John the Baptist was imprisoned and beheaded at Machaerus.

After the deposition and banishment of Herod Antipas in 39 AD, Machaerus passed to Herod Agrippa I until his death in AD 44, after which it came under Roman control. Jewish rebels took control after AD 66 during the First Jewish Revolt.  Shortly after defeating the Jewish garrison of Herodium, the Roman legate Lucilius Bassus advanced on Machaerus with his troops and began siege in AD 72.  An embankment and ramp were created in order to facilitate Roman siege engines but the Jewish rebels capitulated before the Roman attack had begun.  The rebels were allowed to leave and the fortress was torn down, leaving only the foundations intact.

Design
Josephus gives a full description of Machaerus in The Jewish War 7.6.1 ff.  The hilltop, which stands about 1,100 meters above Dead Sea level, is surrounded on all sides by deep ravines which provide great natural strength.  The valley on the west extends 60 stadia to the Dead Sea (Josephus refers to it as Lake Asphaltitis).  The valley on the east descends to a depth of a hundred cubits (150 ft).

Herod the Great regarded the place as deserving the strongest fortification, particularly because of its proximity to Arabia.  On top of the mountain, surrounding the crest, he built a fortress wall, 100 meters long and 60 meters wide with three corner towers, each sixty cubits (90 ft) high.  The palace was built in the center of the fortified area. Numerous cisterns were provided to collect rain water.

The royal courtyard is considered one of the closest and best existing archaeological parallels to the Herodian Gabbatha in the Jerusalem Praetorium, where Pontius Pilate judged Jesus of Nazareth.

Excavation
The village on the plateau to the east of the mountain is called Mukawir (sometimes also rendered as Mkawer). The site was visited in 1807 by the Frisian explorer Ulrich Jasper Seetzen, and the name of the village reminded him of the name of Machaerus in Greek. The archaeological excavation of Machaerus was begun in 1968 by Jerry Vardaman, then of the Southern Baptist Theological Seminary, and later director of the Cobb Institute of Archaeology at Mississippi State University. In 1973, the German scholar, August Strobel, identified and studied the wall by which the Romans encircled the defenders within the fortress. In 1978–1981, excavations were carried out by Virgilio Corbo, Stanislao Loffreda and Michele Piccirillo, from the Studium Biblicum Franciscanum in Jerusalem. 

Within the fortified area are the ruins of the Herodian palace, including rooms, a large courtyard, and an elaborate bath, with fragments of the floor mosaic still remaining. Farther down the eastern slope of the hill are other walls and towers, perhaps representing the "lower town," of which Josephus also wrote. Traceable also, coming from the east, is the aqueduct that brought water to the cisterns of the fortress. Pottery found in the area extends from late Hellenistic to Roman periods and confirms the two main periods of occupation, namely, Hasmonean (90 BC-57 BC) and Herodian (30 BC-AD 72), with a brief reoccupation soon after AD 72 and then nothing further—so complete and systematic was the destruction visited upon the site by the Romans.

Anastylosis
In the spring of 2014, archeologist Győző Vörös, with a team from the Hungarian Academy of Arts and in cooperation with Prince El Hassan bin Talal and Monther Jamhawi, director general of antiquities in Jordan, completed a reconstruction and re-erection of two ancient columns at the site on the basis of the principle of anastylosis. One Doric column from the royal courtyard and one Ionic column from the royal bathhouse were cleaned and conserved in situ and joined together with stainless steel empolia (plugs) which were inserted into the original empolia holes in the center of the column. The team also created a digital reconstruction of what the palace would have looked like, based on their archaeological findings.

See also
Gamla
Herod the Great
Herod Antipas
Masada
Hasmonean desert fortresses
Alexandreion/Alexandrion/Alexandrium
Dok (Dagon) on the Mount of Temptation
Hyrcania (fortress)
Cypros (German article)

Notes

Further reading
Corbo, V. (1978) La fortezza di Macheronte: Rapporto preliminare della prima campagna di scavo: 8 settembre - 28 ottobre 1978. Liber Annuus 28: 217–238. (Excavation Report)
Vörös, Győző. “Machaerus: Where Salome Danced and John the Baptist Was Beheaded.” Biblical Archaeology Review, Sep/Oct 2012, 30–41, 68.
Vörös, Győző (2012) Machaerus: Excavations and Surveys (2009-2012), Hungarian Academy of Arts.
Vörös, Győző. “Anastylosis at Machaerus.” Biblical Archaeology Review, Jan/Feb 2015, 52–61.
Vörös, Győző (2013) Machaerus I: History, Archeology and Architecture of the Fortified Herodian Royal Palace and City Overlooking the Dead Sea in Transjordan. Final Report of the Excavations and Surveys 1807-2012, Milano: Edizioni Terra Santa.
Vörös, Győző (2015) Machaerus II: The Hungarian Archaeological Mission in the Light of the American-Baptist and Italian-Franciscan Excavations and Surveys. Final Report 1968-2015, Milano: Edizioni Terra Santa.
Vörös, Győző (2018) Machaerus project: preliminary report on the 2016-2017 archaeological excavation, ADAJ: 2018, No 59, pp. 435–454.
Vörös, Győző (2019) Machaerus III: Final Report on the Herodian Citadel 1968-2018, Milano: Edizioni Terra Santa.
Vörös, Győző (2022) Machaerus: The Golgotha of John the Baptist, Budapest: MMM Kiadó.

External links
Machaerus, article in historical sourcebook by Mahlon H. Smith
Machaerus, Jordan
The Franciscan Archaeological Institute's Page on "The Fortress at Machaerous"
Studium Biblicum Franciscanum's Page on "The Machaerus Archaeological Excavations in Jordan"
Machaerus: Beyond the Beheading of John the Baptist Biblical Archaeology Society
Photos of Machaerus at the American Center of Research

Buildings and structures completed in the 1st century BC
Buildings and structures demolished in the 1st century BC
Buildings and structures demolished in the 1st century
70s disestablishments in the Roman Empire
1807 archaeological discoveries
Archaeological sites in Jordan
First Jewish–Roman War
Fortifications in Jordan
Herod the Great
Jews and Judaism in Jordan
Jews and Judaism in the Roman Republic and the Roman Empire
Mountain monuments and memorials